Parklands Campus was an independent Non-Maintained residential special school for boys and girls aged 11 to 19, near Abingdon, Oxfordshire, England.
It closed in 2016, and has since this date been vacant. In 2018, Millgate Homes proposed a new development for the land, which is now completed.

It was run by the children's charity Action for Children.

Formerly Bessels Leigh School, it was taken over by children's charity Action for Children and relaunched as Spires School during the summer of 2009. In 2011 it was rebranded as Parklands Campus. It specialised in educating children with autism and related emotional and behavioural difficulties.

References

External links
Action for Children
DCSF: Bessels Leigh School
ISBI: Bessels Leigh School
Ofsted report

Boarding schools in Oxfordshire
Defunct schools in Oxfordshire
Defunct special schools in England
Educational institutions disestablished in 2016
2016 disestablishments in England